The South Sudan national under-20 football team represents South Sudan at age of under-20 levels in the international football and is controlled by the South Sudan Football Association, the governing body for football in South Sudan.

Team image

Nicknames
The South Sudan national under-20 football team has been known or nicknamed as Bright Stars

Home stadium
The team play its home matches on the Malakal Stadium and others stadiums.

History

Current squad 
The following squad was announced for recently finished 2022 CECAFA U-20 Championship

Fixtures and results
Legend

2022

Competition records

FIFA U-20 World Cup record

Africa U-20 Cup of Nations

CECAFA U-20 Championship

References

Under-20
African national under-20 association football teams